Port Elizabeth is an unincorporated community located within Maurice River Township in Cumberland County, New Jersey, United States. The area is served as United States Postal Service ZIP code 08348.

As of the 2000 United States Census, the population for ZIP Code Tabulation Area 08348 was 455.

Route 47 and Route 55 intersect in Port Elizabeth.

Demographics

History
Port Elizabeth, named for Elizabeth Clark Bodly, a Quaker and owner of lands on which Port Elizabeth lays, was laid out in 1785. In 1778, a dam was built on the Manumuskin River, drying out valuable lands for farmers, who flocked in. Further down the river wharves were built, giving Port Elizabeth the Port part of the name.

Historic structures
Port Elizabeth United Methodist Church, built in 1827 to replace Cumberland County's first Methodist Church which was completed in 1786.
John Boggs Hall, built in 1854 as the Port Elizabeth School, was moved to its present location in 1958 where it is used as the Sunday School and fellowship hall of Port Elizabeth United Methodist Church.
Port Elizabeth Library, built in 1810 as a general store, was known as Lee Hall for some time until 1962 when it was the fellowship hall of Port Elizabeth Methodist Church.
Eagle Glass Works Hotel, built around 1807 to house the Eagle Glass Works.
St. Elizabeth of Hungary Roman Catholic Church, built in 1810 for the Eagle Glass Works workers, was moved to Goshen, NJ in 1878.

Notable people
People who were born in, residents of, or otherwise closely associated with Port Elizabeth include:
Mike Lafferty (born 1975), Enduro motorcycle champion.
Thomas Lee (1780–1856), represented New Jersey at large in the United States House of Representatives from 1833-1837. He was postmaster of Port Elizabeth from 1818-1833 and 1846-1849 and founder of Port Elizabeth Library and Academy.

Climate
The climate in this area is characterized by hot, humid summers and generally mild to cool winters.  According to the Köppen Climate Classification system, Port Elizabeth has a humid subtropical climate, abbreviated "Cfa" on climate maps.

References

External links

Census 2000 Fact Sheet for ZIP Code Tabulation Area 08348 from the United States Census Bureau

Maurice River Township, New Jersey
Unincorporated communities in Cumberland County, New Jersey
Unincorporated communities in New Jersey